The Enets (singular: , ; also known as Yenetses, Entsy, Entsi, Yenisei or Yenisey Samoyeds) are a Samoyedic ethnic group who live on the east bank, near the mouth, of the Yenisei River. Historically nomadic people, they now mainly inhabit the village of Potalovo in Krasnoyarsk Krai in western Siberia near the Arctic Circle. According to the 2010 Census, there are 227 Enets in Russia. In Ukraine, there were 26 Entsi in 2001, of whom 18 were capable of speaking the Enets language.

The Enets language is a Samoyedic language, formerly known as Yenisei Samoyedic (not to be confused with the Yeniseian language family, which is completely unrelated). They still speak their language, but education is in Russian so there is fear they may lose their language.

Current situation
British travel writer Colin Thubron visited the town of Potalovo in the late 1990s and found the Entsi deculturated and demoralized, beset with problems of alcoholism. The reindeer collective established in Nikita Khrushchev's day had been severely impacted by acid rain from the nickel smelters at Norilsk. A fur farm that raises fox was similarly diminished. About half the population was unemployed with a few employed in reindeer herding on the west side of the river, the remainder living by fishing in the Yenisei River. Fisherman from Potapovo sometimes catch red sturgeon and Omul, a type of salmon, as well as char, gang fish, and northern pike. Thubron mentions a salted muksun fish product.

Some social services continue to be provided by the Russian government: a small hospital, with a doctor and a few nurses; schools (although older children must attend in Dudinka to the north); and small Russian government pensions. The electric plant had recently burned and electricity was provided intermittently by a generator. Life expectancy is 45 with many dying violent deaths due to family violence and fighting.

See also
 List of indigenous peoples of Russia

Further reading
 The Red Book of the Peoples of the Russian Empire,  This book may be ordered from its Estonian publisher at https://web.archive.org/web/20040217225839/http://www.redbook.ee/english.html
Colin Thubron, In Siberia, HarperCollins, 1999, hardcover, 287 pages, ; British editions, Chatto & Williams or Sinclair Stevenson, October, 1999, hardcover, 320 pages, ; trade paperback, Penguin, September, 2000, 384 pages,

Citations
Article on the Enets in The Red Book of the Peoples of the Russian Empire online version
Adapted from the Wikinfo article, "Enets" https://web.archive.org/web/20070927211239/http://www.internet-encyclopedia.org/wiki.phtml?title=Enets March 3, 2004

References

Ethnic groups in Siberia
Ethnic groups in Russia
Ancient peoples
Indigenous peoples of North Asia
Samoyedic peoples
Krasnoyarsk Krai
Indigenous small-numbered peoples of the North, Siberia and the Far East
Indigenous peoples in the Arctic
Modern nomads

be:Энцы
fa:انتس‌ها	
cs:Enci	
ca:Enets
az:Eneslər	
azb:انس‌لر	
et:Eenetsid
fi:Enetsit
id:Suku Enets
kk:Энец
lt:Encai
lv:Enci
nl:Enetsen
no:Enetsere
pl:Eńcy
pt:Enetses
sr:Енци
tr:Enetsler
uk:Енці
zh:埃涅茨人